The Watchman Fellowship is, according to its website, an independent, non-denominational Christian research and apologetics ministry focusing on new religious movements, cults, the occult and the New Age. It was founded in 1979 and is based in Arlington, Texas, with offices in six states and one in Romania. It was founded in 1978 by David Henke.

The mission of the Watchman Fellowship has three primary goals: to educate the community, to equip the church, and to evangelize the cults. The Fellowship encourages traditional Christians to gather accurate information about groups that deviate from "essential Christian doctrines." Its president is James Walker.

Rather than objecting to paranormal activity on skeptical grounds, the Watchman Fellowship claims that spirits may be real and malevolent.

In 2007, it contributed 45,000 items from the organization's own collection to the Southwestern Baptist Theological Seminary.

See also
 Christian countercult movement

References

External links
Official Website

Christian countercult organizations
Nondenominational Christian societies and communities
Christian organizations established in 1979
Evangelical Ministries to New Religions
Christian apologetics